Ski jumping at the 2023 Winter World University Games was held at the Lake Placid Olympic Ski Jumping Complex from 16 to 20 January 2023.

Men's events

Women's events

Mixed events

Medal table

Participating nations
7 nations participated.

  (4)
  (1)
  (8)
  (5)
  (2)
  (9)
  (3)

References

External links
Ski Jumping at the 2023 Winter World University Games
Results book

2023 Winter World University Games
2023
2023 in ski jumping